The Kerry Bog Village is an open-air museum situated in west County Kerry focused on the culture and history of Ireland. It is a tourist stop on the Ring of Kerry, between the towns of Killorglin and Glenbeigh. The outdoor museum recreates traditional Irish thatched cottages and the lives of their inhabitants during the 19th century. Its founder was involved in the resuscitation of the Kerry Bog Pony as a viable breed.

The village's operators describe the village as the "only one of its kind in Europe", and its structures are furnished with antiques.

References

External links
 
 

Museums in County Kerry